Lawre Osarenkhoe popularly known as MC Casino is a comedian from Nigeria. He got inducted into kingdom Hall of Fame as an ambassador of cultural ethics. The comedian derive joy from making people using his comedy skit.

Education 
The comedian attended University of Benin (Uniben) where he studied agriculture and majored in fishery. He was the SU VP of Uniben while at school.

Career 
As the vice-president of Student Union Government of Uniben of his time, MC Casino started comedy in form of activism in 2008 while he had his first life performance in 2022.

In August 2022, he toured Europe in order to expand his career and share his jokes with Nigerians abroad. He also performed alongside other comedian at a concert in Benin Crown height pavilion event center. His comedy skit are intended to corrected societal ills and this was he made a short film Okwemose.

References 

Nigerian comedians
University of Benin (Nigeria) people
Year of birth missing (living people)
Living people